In geometry, by Thorold Gosset's definition a semiregular polytope is usually taken to be a polytope that is vertex-transitive and has all its facets being regular polytopes. E.L. Elte compiled a longer list in 1912 as The Semiregular Polytopes of the Hyperspaces which included a wider definition.

Gosset's list 
In three-dimensional space and below, the terms semiregular polytope and uniform polytope have identical meanings, because all uniform polygons must be regular. However, since not all uniform polyhedra are regular, the number of semiregular polytopes in dimensions higher than three is much smaller than the number of uniform polytopes in the same number of dimensions.

The three convex semiregular 4-polytopes are the rectified 5-cell, snub 24-cell and rectified 600-cell. The only semiregular polytopes in higher dimensions are the k21 polytopes, where the rectified 5-cell is the special case of k = 0.

Gosset's 4-polytopes (with his names in parentheses)
Rectified 5-cell (Tetroctahedric), 
Rectified 600-cell (Octicosahedric), 
Snub 24-cell (Tetricosahedric),  or 
Semiregular E-polytopes in higher dimensions
5-demicube (5-ic semi-regular), a 5-polytope,  ↔ 
221 polytope (6-ic semi-regular), a 6-polytope,  or 
321 polytope (7-ic semi-regular), a 7-polytope, 
421 polytope (8-ic semi-regular), an 8-polytope,

Euclidean honeycombs

Semiregular polytopes can be extended to semiregular honeycombs. The semiregular Euclidean honeycombs are the tetrahedral-octahedral honeycomb (3D), gyrated alternated cubic honeycomb (3D) and the 521 honeycomb (8D).

Gosset honeycombs:
Tetrahedral-octahedral honeycomb or alternated cubic honeycomb (Simple tetroctahedric check),  ↔  (Also quasiregular polytope)
Gyrated alternated cubic honeycomb (Complex tetroctahedric check), 

Semiregular E-honeycomb:
521 honeycomb (9-ic check) (8D Euclidean honeycomb), 

 additionally allowed Euclidean honeycombs as facets of higher-dimensional Euclidean honeycombs, giving the following additional figures:
Hypercubic honeycomb prism, named by Gosset as the (n – 1)-ic semi-check (analogous to a single rank or file of a chessboard)
Alternated hexagonal slab honeycomb (tetroctahedric semi-check),

Hyperbolic honeycombs

There are also hyperbolic uniform honeycombs composed of only regular cells , including:

Hyperbolic uniform honeycombs, 3D honeycombs:
 Alternated order-5 cubic honeycomb,  ↔  (Also quasiregular polytope)
 Tetrahedral-octahedral honeycomb, 
 Tetrahedron-icosahedron honeycomb, 
Paracompact uniform honeycombs, 3D honeycombs, which include uniform tilings as cells:
 Rectified order-6 tetrahedral honeycomb, 
 Rectified square tiling honeycomb, 
 Rectified order-4 square tiling honeycomb,  ↔ 
 Alternated order-6 cubic honeycomb,  ↔  (Also quasiregular)
 Alternated hexagonal tiling honeycomb,  ↔ 
 Alternated order-4 hexagonal tiling honeycomb,  ↔ 
 Alternated order-5 hexagonal tiling honeycomb,  ↔ 
 Alternated order-6 hexagonal tiling honeycomb,  ↔ 
 Alternated square tiling honeycomb,  ↔  (Also quasiregular)
 Cubic-square tiling honeycomb, 
 Order-4 square tiling honeycomb,  = 
 Tetrahedral-triangular tiling honeycomb, 
9D hyperbolic paracompact honeycomb:
 621 honeycomb (10-ic check),

See also
Semiregular polyhedron

References 

 
 
 
 
 

Polytopes